Ajay Singh Chaudhary is an Indian television actor and model known for playing the role of Dev in Anuraag Basu Tv Series “Love Story” on Sab Tv. 
He Played ACP Abhay Rai Singh in Phulwa, Vishnu Kashyap in Uttaran, Akash in Junoon – Aisi Nafrat Toh Kaisa Ishq, and as Baldev Singh in Rishton Ka Chakravyuh and as Pralyankar in Tenali Rama. 
He played “Hamid” in a Webseries called “Crackdown” on  Voot Select OTT Platform.
He is currently seen as Ajit Lamba in Colors TV's Swaran Ghar.

Career
Chaudhary started his career with Love Story as Dev on SAB TV and appears in the role of Abhay & Vishnu in Phulwa & Uttaran.

Television

References

External links

Living people
Indian male television actors
Indian male soap opera actors
Male actors from Mumbai
21st-century Indian male actors
Male actors in Hindi television
1983 births